Vasiliki "Vaso" Plevritou  (born 8 June 1998) is a Greek female water polo player. She plays for Olympiacos in Greece. She was a part of the team winning the 2015 Women's LEN Super Cup. She was part of the Greece national team winning the bronze medal at the 2015 European Games. She started competing in water polo in 2008.

References

External links
 at Baku 2015

1998 births
Living people
Greek female water polo players
Water polo players from Thessaloniki
Water polo players at the 2015 European Games
Olympiacos Women's Water Polo Team players
European Games bronze medalists for Greece
European Games medalists in water polo
21st-century Greek women